The Grand Partition and the Abrogation of Idolatry is the debut album by American death metal band Success Will Write Apocalypse Across the Sky, Produced, Mixed and Mastered by James Murphy, and released on May 5, 2009 through Nuclear Blast.

Track listing
"10,000 Sermons, One Solution" - 2:29
"The Realization That Mankind Is Viral in Its Nature" - 1:40
"Cattle" - 2:17
"Agenda" - 2:47
"Pity the Living, Envy the Dead" - 0:52
"Despot" - 3:10
"A Path" - 2:11
"Automated Oration and the Abolition of Silence" - 2:53
"One Must Imagine Sisyphus Happy" - 3:18 
"Colossus" - 1:33
"Retrograde and the Anointed" - 2:37
"Of Worms, Jesus Christ, and Jackson County, Missouri" - 3:15
"The Tamagotchi Gesture" - 3:14 
(Untitled hidden track) - 8:34

Personnel
John Collett – vocals 
Aaron Haines – guitar
Ian Sturgill – guitar
Matt Simpson – bass
Jen Muse – samples
Mike Heller – Session drums
James Murphy - Producer

References

2009 debut albums
Nuclear Blast albums
Success Will Write Apocalypse Across the Sky albums
Albums produced by James Murphy (electronic musician)